Pape Demba Armand Tourézé (born 31 December 1984) is a Senegalese former professional footballer who played as a striker. He dropped the 'zé' part of his surname when he was 20, re-registering his name with FIFA as Demba Armand Touré.

Club career
Touré was born in Dakar, Senegal. He played at Olympique Lyonnais for the 2002–03 and 2003–04 seasons, and was then loaned to Grasshopper Club Zürich for 2004–05 and 2005–ß6.

Touré signed a -year contract with Astra Ploiești in November 2011. He left Astra Ploiești in December 2011 due to financial dispute with the club. Touré signed with Al-Oruba Dubai in January 2012 for only six months.

On 27 December 2012, Toure signed with Maltese club Valletta F.C. On 4 July 2013, he signed a two-year contract with league rivals Birkirkara F.C.

International career
Touré was called up to the Senegal national team for the 2008 African Cup of Nations qualifying game against Burkina Faso in October 2006 to replace the injured Marseille striker Mamadou Niang. In 2007 he earned five caps scoring three goals.

References

External links
 
 

1984 births
Living people
Footballers from Dakar
Senegalese footballers
Senegal international footballers
Association football forwards
Ligue 1 players
Olympique Lyonnais players
Swiss Super League players
Grasshopper Club Zürich players
Ukrainian Premier League players
FC Dynamo Kyiv players
Ligue 2 players
Stade de Reims players
Liga I players
FC Astra Giurgiu players
Oman Professional League players
Maltese Premier League players
Valletta F.C. players
Birkirkara F.C. players
Tarxien Rainbows F.C. players
Naxxar Lions F.C. players
Għajnsielem F.C. players
Żebbuġ Rangers F.C. players
Senegalese expatriate footballers
Expatriate footballers in France
Expatriate footballers in Malta
Expatriate footballers in Oman
Expatriate footballers in Switzerland
Expatriate footballers in Ukraine
Senegalese expatriate sportspeople in France
Senegalese expatriate sportspeople in Malta
Senegalese expatriate sportspeople in Oman
Senegalese expatriate sportspeople in Switzerland
Senegalese expatriate sportspeople in Ukraine